The Biggest Loser UK 2012 is the fifth series of the reality television show titled The Biggest Loser. The series began on ITV on 3 January 2012 and ended on 13 March 2012, with seven overweight pairs (fourteen individuals) competing for a cash prize. Davina McCall is featured as the host, with trainer Richard Callender and two new trainers, Charlotte Ord and Rob Edmond, who replaced Angie Dowds. Dowds had left the show part-way through the fourth season, although she returned for the final. Dowds died on 23 November 2011 in an apparent suicide. The prize of £25,000 was won by Kevin McLernon, who shed 40% of his body weight.

Contestants
There are 14 contestants in this season, competing as 7 teams of two.

The "Total Votes" column indicates the number of votes cast against the contestant when he/she was eliminated.
 Geoff was forced to withdraw by the doctor, due to having an undiagnosed heart attack. He did not weigh in at any point during the series, including the finale.
 The contestants voted for Sam & Damien to go home, but as a result of Geoff's withdrawal, one of them was allowed to stay. Their fate was to be decided by the biggest loser, but as Damien was below the yellow line, Kevin became the biggest loser for the week and sent Sam home.

Weigh-Ins

Winners
 £25,000 winner (among the finalists)
 Holiday winner (among the eliminated contestants)
Standings
 Week's Biggest Loser
 Week's Biggest Loser & Immunity
 Immunity (Challenge or Weigh-In)
 Under the Yellow Line
 Week's Biggest Loser & Under the Yellow Line
 Highest Percentage Weight Loss (among the eliminated contestants)

Weigh-In Figures History

Notes
 *In week 2, Damien's and Sarah's weight losses were displayed at -5 and -3 respectively due to their one-pound disadvantages from the weekly challenge.
 **In week 7, Kevin's weight loss was displayed at -9 due to his one-pound disadvantage from the weekly challenge.

Weigh-In Percentages History

Notes
In week 2, Damien's and Sarah's weight loss percentages were displayed at -1.51% and -1.15% respectively due to their one-pound disadvantages from the weekly challenge.

Elimination Voting History

 Not in house for vote
 Immunity
 Immunity, vote not revealed
 Immunity, was below yellow line or not in elimination, unable to vote
 Below yellow line, unable to vote
 Below red line
 Not in elimination, unable to vote
 Eliminated or not in house
 Last person eliminated
 Valid vote cast
 Vote not revealed
 £25,000 winner (among the finalists)

Ratings

References

External links

2012 British television seasons
UK